Chés Cabotans is a marionette show from the city of Amiens, France, performed in the French language and in the Picard language. Its main character is named Lafleur. Lafleur and his wife Sandrine speak picard.

It is the last show of its type still in operation in Amiens. During the nineteenth century, the city was home to numerous performances of this sort.

History
The troupe "Chés Cabotans d'Amiens" was founded in 1933 by Maurice Domon.

In 1997, the troupe took up residence in a specially-modified theatre, in the heart of the old working-class neighbourhood of Amiens' city centre.

References

 Dolls and puppets, Max von Boehn, C. T. Branford Co., p 488–492 (1956)
   Picardie, Guides Bleus, Hachette (2007)
  Les théâtres populaires à Amiens ; Lafleur est-il Picard?, Édouard David, Yvert et Tellier, Amiens (1906)
 Les marionnettes picardes des origines à 1960, Éditeur : MARTELLE, (1996)
  Jean-Pierre Facquier sculpteur et la marionnette Lafleur, Philippe Leleux, Éditions Librairie du labyrinthe,  (2010)

External links
 http://www.ches-cabotans-damiens.com/
 Documentary about the wood carver Jean-Pierre Facquier.

Puppet theaters
Amiens
1933 establishments in France
Tourist attractions in Somme (department)
Theatres in France
Puppetry in France